Aaj Ka Daur is a 1985 Indian Hindi-language film directed by K. Bapayya. It stars Jackie Shroff, Padmini Kolhapure, Kader Khan, it is a remake of 1981 Tamil film Kudumbam Oru Kadambam. According to Pratiksha Mestry of Mid-Day, Aaj Ka Daur, along with Himmatwala (1983), is Khan's first attempt at comedy. For his work, Khan received a nomination for the Best Performance in a Comic Role at the 33rd Filmfare Awards.

Plot
This film is about a university graduate Jackie Shroff, who can get no better job than a petrol pump employee, a girl Padmini Kolhapure, who is struggling to pay for college, and others in a building owned by Prem Chopra, who attempts to evict them with the help of Shakti Kapoor.

Cast
The cast is listed below:

Jackie Shroff as Raja
Padmini Kolhapure as Durga Agnihotri
Prem Chopra as Fakirchand
Nirupa Roy as Laxmi Agnihotri
Kader Khan as Vishwapratap Gyandev Agnihotri
Shakti Kapoor as Leo
Aruna Irani as Mrs. Leo
Bindu as Bijli, Laundry Woman
Sachin Pilgaonkar as Pratap Kapoor
Shoma Anand as Sharda Kapoor
Raj Kiran as Ram Dard
Roshni as Seeta Dard
Goga Kapoor as Sethji, Leo's boss
Iftekhar as Wealthy Man
Deep Dhillon as Office Boss of Sharda Kapoor
Manik Irani as Jango, henchman of Leo
Vikas Anand as Police Inspector

Soundtrack
Composed by Bappi Lahiri and written by Indeevar, the soundtrack includes the following songs:

Accolades

References

External links

1985 films
1980s Hindi-language films
Films directed by K. Bapayya
Films scored by Bappi Lahiri
Hindi remakes of Tamil films